Clemente "Chito" Agosto (born in ) is a Puerto Rican politician and the current mayor of Toa Alta. Agosto is affiliated with the Popular Democratic Party (PPD) and has served as mayor since 2013.

Agosto has an associate degree in Business Administration from the Interamerican University of Puerto Rico. He started his professional career as an entrepreneur, and was owner of various restaurants.

References

1974 births
Living people
Interamerican University of Puerto Rico alumni
Mayors of places in Puerto Rico
Popular Democratic Party (Puerto Rico) politicians
People from Toa Alta, Puerto Rico